The 2022–23 season is the 124th season in the history of Bayern Munich and their 58th consecutive season in the top flight of German football. In addition to the domestic league, they are participating in this season's editions of the DFB-Pokal, DFL-Supercup and UEFA Champions League.

The season is the first since 2013–14 without Robert Lewandowski, who departed to FC Barcelona.

Players

Squad

Transfers

In

Out

Transfer summary
Undisclosed fees are not included in the transfer totals.

Expenditure

Summer:  €140,100,000

Winter:  €8,000,000

Total:  €148,100,000

Income

Summer:  €106,600,000

Winter:  €0,000,000

Total:  €106,600,000

Net totals

Summer:  €33,500,000

Winter:  €8,000,000

Total:  €41,500,000

Pre-season and friendlies

Competitions

Overall record

Bundesliga

League table

Results summary

Results by round

Matches
The league fixtures were announced on 17 June 2022.

DFB-Pokal

DFL-Supercup

UEFA Champions League

Group stage

The group stage draw was held on 25 August 2022.

Knockout phase

Round of 16
The draw for the round of 16 was held on 7 November 2022.

Quarter-finals
The draw for the quarter-finals was held on 17 March 2023.

Statistics

Appearances and goals

|-
! colspan="18" style=background:#dcdcdc; text-align:center| Goalkeepers 

|-
! colspan="18" style=background:#dcdcdc; text-align:center| Defenders 

 

|-
! colspan="18" style=background:#dcdcdc; text-align:center| Midfielders  

 

|-
! colspan="18" style=background:#dcdcdc; text-align:center| Forwards 

 
 

|-
! colspan="18" style=background:#dcdcdc; text-align:center| Players transferred out during the season 

|-

Goalscorers

Notes

References

FC Bayern Munich seasons
Bayern Munich
Bayern Munich